Forsell or Forssell is a Swedish surname. Notable people with the surname include:

Carl Forssell (1917–2005), Swedish fencer
Daniel Forsell (born 1982), Swedish football defender
Elisabeth Forsell (fl. 1747), Swedish weaver
Erik Forssell (born 1982), Swedish professional ice hockey player 
Gry Forssell (born 1973), Swedish television host
Hans Forssell (1843–1901), Swedish historian and political writer
Harry Forssell (1907–2006), Olympic swimmer from Brazil
Johan Forssell (politician, born 1855) (1855–1914), Swedish politician
Johan Forssell (politician, born 1979) (born 1979), Swedish politician
John Forsell (1868-1941), Swedish opera singer
Kyllikki Forssell (1925-2019), Finnish actress
Lars Forssell (1928–2007), Swedish writer 
Mikael Forssell (born 1981), Finnish football striker
Petteri Forsell (born 1990), Finnish footballer 
William Forsell Kirby (1844–1912), English entomologist

Swedish-language surnames